Radio source may refer to:

 An astronomical radio source
 A radio transmitter
 The Radio Open Source podcast and blog

See also
 Radio noise source, a device that emits radio waves at a certain frequency, used to calibrate radio telescope
 Source Radio, a radio station operating from Coventry, England

de:Radioquelle
es:Radiofuente
it:Radiosorgente
pl:Radioźródło
zh:無線電波源